Windsor Village Historic District is a national historic district located at Windsor in Broome County, New York.  The district includes 70 contributing buildings, two contributing sites (village cemetery and village green), and one contributing structure (bandstand).  The district includes the core of the business district and many older residential streets.  The oldest building dates to about 1810.

It was listed on the National Register of Historic Places in 1980.

References

Historic districts on the National Register of Historic Places in New York (state)
Historic districts in Broome County, New York
National Register of Historic Places in Broome County, New York